Gioacchino De Palma (born 21 May 1940) is an Italian long-distance runner. He competed in the marathon at the 1968 Summer Olympics.

References

External links
 

1940 births
Living people
Athletes (track and field) at the 1968 Summer Olympics
Italian male long-distance runners
Italian male marathon runners
Olympic athletes of Italy
Sportspeople from Bari